Tamil Nadu State Department of Archaeology (TNSDA) is the archaeology department of the Government of Tamil Nadu. Founded in 1961, the department is headed by an Indian Administrative Service (IAS) officer with the designation Commissioner for Archaeology and conducts archaeological excavations in the state of Tamil Nadu.

Headquarters 
The department initially functioned from a rented house in Besant Nagar, Chennai. In 2003, it moved to its present premises - a newly constructed building named "Tamil Valarchi Valagam" in Halls Road, Egmore.

Library 
The department has a library at its headquarters in Chennai with over 11,500 volumes on archaeology, anthropology, art, history, epigraphy and palaeography. It houses copies of important journals such as Indian Antiquary, Asiatic Researches, Sacred Books of the East, International Journal of Dravidian Linguistics and Journal of Tamil Studies.

Publications 
The department publishes a quarterly journal called Kalvettu. Like the Archaeological Survey of India (ASI), it also publishes excavation reports and guide books for tourists, as well as district-wise lists of inscriptions and museum guides.

Epigraphy 
An epigraphy wing was inaugurated in 1966. Since its inception, the epigraphy wing has prepared estampages of about 14,000 inscriptions which are preserved at a facility in Udagamandalam. The department started an institute for epigraphy in 1973–74. The institute conducts one year post graduate diploma courses in epigraphy and archaeology for Tamil, Sanskrit or history graduates of the University of Madras.

List of directors 
 T. N. Ramachandran (1964–66)
 R. Nagaswamy (1966–88)
 Natana Kasinathan
 T. Udhayachandran  (Tamil: த. உதயச்சந்திரன்) Commissioner of Archaeology, Government of Tamil Nadu.

Excavations 

Please see the list here List of Archaeological Excavations Conducted by the Department of Archaeology 

So far, the department has excavated 32 sites.

 Anaimalai (1968)
 Kovalanpottal (1980)
 Tiruttangal (1994–95)
 Teruruveli (1999-2000)
 Kodumanal
 Mangudi
 Vasavasamudram
 Karur
 Alangulam

See also 
 Karnataka State Department of Archaeology
 Kerala State Archaeology Department

References

External links 
 
 
 
 

Tamil Nadu state government departments
State archaeology departments of India